Mekiši kod Vižinade is a village in Vižinada municipality in Istria County, Croatia.

References

Populated places in Istria County